Jens Reynders (born 25 May 1998) is a Belgian racing cyclist, who currently rides for UCI ProTeam .

Major results
2015
 1st Stage 2a (TTT) Aubel–Thimister–La Gleize
2017
 7th Antwerpse Havenpijl
2018
 1st Grand Prix OST Manufaktur
 2nd Road race, National Under-23 Road Championships
 5th PWZ Zuidenveld Tour
 8th Grand Prix Albert Fauville-Baulet
2019
 1st Grand Prix de la ville de Pérenchies
 3rd Paris–Roubaix Espoirs
 3rd Ghent–Wevelgem U23
2021
 1st GP Beeckman-De Caluwé
 5th Egmont Cycling Race
 5th Grote Prijs Marcel Kint
 7th Route Adélie
 9th Grote Prijs Jef Scherens

References

External links

1998 births
Living people
Belgian male cyclists
People from Tongeren
Cyclists from Limburg (Belgium)
21st-century Belgian people